The following are league-based football competitions run by UEFA:

 UEFA European Championship, a continental international team's championship played every four years
 UEFA Women's Championship, the women's equivalent of the UEFA European Championship
 UEFA Champions League, the premier men's club competition (formerly European Cup)
 UEFA Europa League, the secondary men's club competition (formerly UEFA Cup)
 UEFA Europa Conference League, the tertiary men's club competition
 UEFA Futsal Champions League, formerly the UEFA Futsal Cup
 UEFA Nations League, an international teams' biennial competition
 UEFA Women's Champions League, the main women's club competition (formerly UEFA Women's Cup)
 UEFA Youth League, a European club competition

See also
 Euro league (disambiguation)
 European league (disambiguation)
 Continental League (disambiguation)